Ridha Belhaj, (born 16 February 1962) is a Tunisian lawyer, senior official and politician.

Biography 
Ridha Belhaj studied at Alaoui High School in Tunis and then at the Tunisian-Algerian Institute, where he obtained a law degree in 1986 and a diploma in customs and tax economics in 1988.

He was first head of service in the general directorate of participations of the Ministry of Finance. From 2002, he practiced as a lawyer with the Court of cassation.

Having served as the General-secretary and delegate-minister in Beji Caid Essebsi's Transitional Government from February 2011 to December 2011.

On 1 January 2015, the new president of Tunisia Essebsi appointed him the head of his presidential cabinet. On 1 February 2016, Belhaj stepped back to be replaced by Caid Essebsi's cousin Selim Azzabi.

After leaving the government, he joined Nidaa Toune. Member, spokesperson and then vice-president of Nidaa Tounes, he resigned from this party in February 2016 due to political perspective problems. In 2017, he announced the creation of a new party called Tounes Awalan of which he is the chairman of the constitutive committee.

Honours
 Commander of the Order of the Republic of Tunisia (2011)

Private life 
Ridha Belhaj is married and has three children.

References

1962 births
Living people
Nidaa Tounes politicians
People from Tunis
20th-century Tunisian lawyers
21st-century Tunisian lawyers